The following are the football (soccer) events of the year 1945 throughout the world.

Events
2 April – The Austrian First Division is abandoned after 9 rounds due to the final stages of the war.
The communist authorities in Yugoslavia ban major football clubs Građanski Zagreb, SK Jugoslavija, HAŠK, HŠK Concordia, FK Slavija and SAŠK Sarajevo among others.
25 July – At the annual meeting of The Football League in London, it is agreed to continue regional leagues for a further season despite the end of World War II, as clubs feel unable to cope with the demands of a full League season.
26 August – French professional football is resumed for the first time since 1938–39.

Winners club national championship 
 Argentina: River Plate
 Chile: Green Cross
 Costa Rica: Alajuelense
 Hungary: Újpest FC
 Ireland: Cork United
 Paraguay: Libertad
 Scotland:
Scottish Cup: No competition
 Spain: Barcelona
 Sweden: IFK Norrköping
 Turkey: Fenerbahçe, Harb Okulu
 Uruguay: Peñarol
 Soviet Union Dynamo Moscow

Births 
 20 January – Børge Bach, Danish international footballer (died 2016)
 14 February – Ladislao Mazurkiewicz, Uruguayan international footballer and manager (died 2013)
 24 March – Dumitru Antonescu, Romanian international footballer (died 2016)
 3 April – Gary Sprake, Welsh international footballer (died 2016)
 1 March – Fidel Uriarte, Spanisch international footballer (died 2016)
 12 May – Alan Ball, English international footballer (died 2007)
 14 May – Yochanan Vollach, Israeli international footballer
 12 June – Pat Jennings, Northern Irish international footballer
 14 July – Pablo Forlán, Uruguayan international footballer
 11 September – Franz Beckenbauer, German international footballer and manager
 20 October – Romeo Benetti, Italian international footballer
 11 November – Odd Iversen, Norwegian international footballer (died 2014)
 6 December – Chris Dekker, Dutch footballer and manager

Deaths
 13 March: Guus van Hecking Colenbrander, Dutch international footballer (born 1887)
 26 March: Dennis Hodgetts, English international footballer (born 1863)
 27 March: Ángel Melogno, Uruguayan international midfielder, winner of the 1930 FIFA World Cup. (40)

References

 
Association football by year